Rosters at the 2005 IIHF World Championships in Austria.

Rosters
Typically, the World Championships are played at the same time as the Stanley Cup Playoffs are in the NHL. This causes NHL player selections to be limited to those whose seasons has ended. The 2005 Tournament had rosters made up of more top end talent, as players were available due to the NHL Lockout in 2005, which saw the season cancelled and the Stanley Cup vacated.

Czech Republic

Canada

Russia

Finland

Sweden

U.S.A.

Slovakia

References

https://web.archive.org/web/20100308074814/http://hokej.snt.cz/index.html

rosters
IIHF World Championship rosters